Debra Jo Fondren (born February 5, 1955) is an American model and actress. She was Playboy magazine's Playmate of the Month for the September 1977 issue and Playmate of the Year for 1978. Her pictorial was photographed by Robert Scott Hooper.

Career
Fondren, who lived in Lumberton, Texas, and was working as a waitress at Gallagher's in Beaumont, Texas, was discovered on a visit to Las Vegas by photographer Robert Scott Hooper, who also photographed her centerfold, featuring her very long, almost knee-length blonde hair. Fondren had guest-starring roles on television series such as Mork & Mindy and Fantasy Island. She also appeared in movies such as Spit Fire. In 2007, she returned home to the Lumberton/Silsbee, Texas, area, having stated she had enough of the California lifestyle and now operates a beauty school in her home area.

TV appearances
Mork & Mindy
Knots Landing
Fantasy Island
Family Feud

References

External links
 
 
 
 
 

1955 births
Living people
American film actresses
American television actresses
People from Lumberton, Texas
1970s Playboy Playmates
Playboy Playmates of the Year
Actresses from Texas
Actresses from Los Angeles
21st-century American women